Feudal is a hamlet in Perdue No. 346, Saskatchewan, Canada. The hamlet is located at the junction of Highway 655 and Township road 340 approximately 15 km north of the Village of Harris.

See also

 List of communities in Saskatchewan
 Hamlets of Saskatchewan

References

Perdue No. 346, Saskatchewan
Unincorporated communities in Saskatchewan